Néstor Luis Reverol Torres (born 28 October 1964) holds the position of Minister of the People's Power for Interior Relations and Justice of Venezuela and is currently Commander General of the National Guard of Venezuela. On 3 August 2016, he was appointed as  interior minister  by President Nicolás Maduro.

Education
Reverol was born in the coastal city of Maracaibo, capital of the Zulia state. He studied at the Military Academy of the National Guard, where he obtained his Bachelor of Science in Military Arts Degree in 1986. He later attended the School of the Americas in Fort Benning, undergoing training with the US Army in 1996.

Controversy

Drug trafficking
In 2016, the United States government has alleged that Reverol was involved in drug trafficking when he was head of the Oficina Nacional Antidrogas (ONA).

Sanctions 
Reverol has been sanctioned by several countries and is banned from entering neighboring Colombia. The Colombian government maintains a list of people banned from entering Colombia or subject to expulsion; as of January 2019, the list had 200 people with a "close relationship and support for the Nicolás Maduro regime".

In July 2017, thirteen senior officials, including Reverol, of the Venezuelan government associated with the 2017 Venezuelan Constituent Assembly elections were sanctioned by the United States for their role in undermining democracy and human rights.

Canada sanctioned 40 Venezuelan officials, including Reverol, in September 2017. The sanctions were for behaviors that undermined democracy after at least 125 people will killed in the 2017 Venezuelan protests and "in response to the government of Venezuela's deepening descent into dictatorship".  Canadians were banned from transactions with the 40 individuals, whose Canadian assets were frozen.

The European Union sanctioned seven Venezuela officials, including Reverol, on 18 January 2018, singling them out as being responsible for deteriorating democracy in the country. The sanctioned individuals were prohibited from entering the nations of the European Union, and their assets were frozen.  

In March 2018, Panama sanctioned 55 public officials, including Reverol, and Switzerland implemented sanctions, freezing the assets of seven ministers and high officials, including Reverol, due to human rights violations and deteriorating rule of law and democracy.

On 20 April 2018, the Mexican Senate froze the assets of officials of the Maduro administration, including Reverol, and prohibited them from entering Mexico.

References

1964 births
Living people
Venezuelan Ministers of Interior
People from Cabimas
United Socialist Party of Venezuela politicians
People of the Crisis in Venezuela
Fugitives wanted by the United States
Justice ministers of Venezuela
Energy ministers of Venezuela